Ansett Australia was a major Australian airline group, based in Melbourne, Australia.  The airline flew domestically within Australia and from the 1990s to destinations in Asia. After operating for 65 years, the airline was placed into administration in 2001 following a financial collapse and subsequent organised liquidation in 2002, subject to deed of company arrangement. The last flight touched down on 5 March 2002.

History

Beginning
The company was founded by Reginald "Reg" Ansett in 1935 as Ansett Airways Pty Ltd.  This was an offshoot of his road transport business, which had become so successful it was threatening the freight and passenger revenue of Victorian Railways.  This led the state government to legislate to put private road transport operators out of business. Reg Ansett countered by establishing an airline, as aviation was under control of the federal government and beyond the reach of the state government.

Ansett's first route between Hamilton and Melbourne operated by a Fokker Universal monoplane commenced on 17 February 1936. The rapid success of the airline led Ansett to float the business in 1937. As the route network expanded, Ansett Airways imported Lockheed Electra aircraft. During World War II, Ansett opted to suspend all scheduled services, except the Hamilton service, in favour of more lucrative work for the United States Army Air Forces. After the war, Ansett battled to re-establish his domestic routes using war-surplus Douglas DC-3s, converted from C-47s and the remaining Lockheed Electras.

At this time, the Australian domestic airline travel sector was dominated by Australian National Airways (ANA), established in 1936 by a consortium of British-financed Australian shipowners. The Chifley federal government was determined to establish a state-owned airline to operate all domestic and international services. It was eventually thwarted in this aim by the High Court of Australia, so it established Trans-Australia Airlines (TAA) to operate in competition with ANA.

Towards a duopoly

 

Ansett Airways remained a big player as ANA and TAA battled for supremacy in the 1940s and 1950s. Ansett operated around the big two, maintaining budget-fare interstate operations with DC-3s and later Convair CV-340s previously operated by Braniff International Airways in the United States. The airline was backed up by extensive road transport operations, including Ansett Freight Express and Ansett Pioneer Coaches, as well as the Ansair coach-building operation.

The Menzies government, while supporting TAA, because of the excellent dividends it paid to the government, wanted to avoid TAA having a monopoly on domestic services if ANA collapsed, as seemed likely. The only alternative, as it transpired, was for Ansett to buy the ANA operation. Ansett's bid had a number of financial supporters, most prominent of these being the Shell Oil Company. Douglas Aircraft Company was also concerned about ANA's demise, as TAA had ceased to be a customer for their aircraft. The ANA directors fiercely resisted this initially, but in October 1957, succumbed to Ansett's offer of £3.3 million for their airline. The new entity was called Ansett-ANA, the name it retained until 1 November 1968, when it became Ansett Airlines of Australia.

Ansett-ANA's excellent profit record was, at least in part, courtesy of the Menzies government's Two Airlines Policy. The policy effectively blocked any other domestic interstate operators by way of a ban on importation of aircraft without a government licence. From 1957 until the 1980s, under the strict rules set down by the Two Airlines Policy, Ansett and TAA operated as virtual carbon copies of each other, operating the same aircraft at the same times, to the same destinations, at fares, which were identical (under strict federal government policy). If either airline wished to change its fares, they had to obtain federal government approval.

Reg Ansett then set out to ensure no other competitors could rise up to challenge his airline. He took control of Adelaide-based Guinea Airways (renamed Airlines of South Australia) and Sydney-based Butler Air Transport (renamed Airlines of New South Wales). The takeover of Butler was achieved with covert support from the Menzies government and by Ansett engineering his employees' purchases of Butler shares (in a similar way as had just been attempted by Butler). He then flew the employees to a general meeting in Sydney and forced a vote in favour of selling out to Ansett.

Following the takeover of ANA, Reg Ansett lobbied the government to block TAA's purchase of Sud Aviation Caravelle jet aircraft. He was concerned about his airline's ability to finance equivalent jet aircraft, and the major engineering leap required to go from an all-piston fleet direct to pure jet aircraft, TAA had been operating prop-jet Vickers Viscounts since 1954,  so had expertise in jet technology. Ansett was successful in convincing the government to authorise the importation of more Viscounts and the new Lockheed L-188 Electra, marketed as the "Golden Jet" as with other turboprop airliners of the day. This action delayed the introduction of pure jet aircraft to Australian domestic airlines until 1964, when the Boeing 727-100 "Fan Jet" began flying.

An unusual feature of Ansett's operations was the flying-boat service from Rose Bay in Sydney to Lord Howe Island. This was operated by Ansett Flying Boat Services using Short Sandringham four-engined aircraft. The service ceased in 1974 when the Lord Howe Island Airport was completed.

Expansion beyond domestic aviation
Ansett lost control of the company to Peter Abeles' TNT and Rupert Murdoch's News Corporation in 1979, with Abeles taking operational control of the airline. The airline prospered in the 1980s, but a number of substantial investments performed badly, including a share in the US America West Airlines (which filed for bankruptcy and survived) and its Hamilton Island resort (which went into receivership). Ansett also paid millions of dollars for the right to be official airline of the Sydney 2000 Olympics, an investment generally regarded as unwise. This destabilised the financial position of the company considerably. In 1984, Ansett was embroiled in controversy after it banned HIV-positive individuals from travelling on their planes to protect their staff. The Australian Flight Attendants Association ultimately rejected the bans.

Ansett expanded into New Zealand in 1987 through its subsidiary Ansett New Zealand after the government of New Zealand opened its skies to the airline. After the government of Australia reneged on an agreement to reciprocate, Air New Zealand tried to acquire a share of Qantas when it was floated in 1995, but was not allowed. Instead, it bought TNT's 50% stake in Ansett Australia for A$475 million in 1996, though managerial control remained in the hands of News Corporation. Ansett Australia then had to divest itself of Ansett New Zealand to avoid creating a monopoly.

Ansett commenced international service on 11 September 1993 to Bali, followed by Osaka and Hong Kong in 1994, Jakarta on 12 January 1996, and Shanghai on 8 June 1997. Later, Seoul, Taipei, and Kuala Lumpur flights were inaugurated and soon suspended.

Air New Zealand merger and collapse

In February 2000, Air New Zealand acquired full ownership of Ansett, buying out News Corporation's stake for A$680 million, surpassing Singapore Airlines's A$500 million bid.

Competition from Qantas and a succession of low-cost airlines (Impulse Airlines and Virgin Blue), top-heavy and substantially overpaid staff, an aging fleet, and grounding of the Boeing 767 fleet due to maintenance irregularities left Ansett seriously short of cash, losing $1.3 million a day.

Air New Zealand attempted to cut Ansett's costs while expecting to maintain the same level of revenue. This did not work, as the cost cutting hurt Ansett. Additionally, Ansett's fleet had been allowed to deteriorate, a situation that came to a head with a partial grounding of its Boeing 767 fleet during the Christmas 2000 season and a full grounding in Easter 2001. Ansett was thus unable to compete with the low-cost carriers and Qantas, which were able to run at a loss on some routes, as they could not maintain revenue while cutting their costs, which included laying off staff.

A deal made in April 2001 for Ansett to purchase Virgin Blue was repudiated by Virgin chief Richard Branson in August, and Singapore Airlines, which was initially blocked from buying Ansett, was also prevented from investing further in Air New Zealand/Ansett by the New Zealand government. It then declined to take up an earlier proposed deal to inject over $500 million into Air New Zealand, and Ansett after talks collapsed.

In early September 2001, as the trouble worsened, the New Zealand government prepared to rescue Air New Zealand (eventually buying 83% of the company for NZ$885 million), but cut Ansett adrift. Despite public pleas, the Australian government refused to bail out Ansett.

Quickly running out of both lines of credit and options, Air New Zealand on 12 September 2001 placed the Ansett group of companies into voluntary administration with PriceWaterhouseCoopers. On 14 September, the administrator determined that Ansett was not viable to continue operations (primarily due to the apparent lack of any funds to cover fuel, catering, or employee wages) and grounded the fleets of Ansett and its subsidiaries Hazelton Airlines, Kendell, Skywest, and Aeropelican. Flights already in the air at the time the decision was made continued on to their destinations. Customers and almost all employees had no warning of the stoppage in operations. An Ansett Boeing 767-200 operating on behalf of Ansett Airfreight due to depart Melbourne for Launceston, Tasmania, was the first aircraft to be stopped from flying. It was unable to be unloaded until midday the next day, as no paid staff were on duty. Everyone had been told in the days leading up to 14 September that flights would continue on schedule, and most Ansett employees did not find out until they showed up for work at dawn that day. Thousands of passengers were left stranded and more than 16,000 people found themselves out of a job, making this the largest mass job-loss event in Australian history. Widespread protests were held by workers, including the blockade of an Air New Zealand plane about to carry then New Zealand Prime Minister Helen Clark home from Melbourne.

The then Ansett administrators alleged that Air New Zealand had engaged in asset stripping of Ansett, and had sustained excessive fuel costs for Ansett due to Air New Zealand's failure to hedge them, leaving Ansett susceptible to major fluctuations in fuel charges during 2000. These claims were denied by Air New Zealand, noting it had funded Ansett's loss of A$180 million in the last year. Ansett's administrators later admitted no evidence of any asset stripping was found.

Ansett Mark II and Tesna
After receiving a federal government guarantee, Ansett resumed limited services between major cities on 1 October 2001, using only the Airbus A320 Skystar fleet. This was referred to as Ansett Mark II, an operation run and financed by Ansett Australia under administration. The purpose of getting Ansett back into the air was to attract a buyer for the business and to generate positive cash flow. Attempts by Ansett's Voluntary Administrators to re-engage Singapore Airlines to consider a role in resurrecting Ansett through a meeting on 6 October 2001 resulted in SA agreeing to play a consultancy role in this effort.

The revived and scaled-back operation ran on a tight budget, and its service reflected that. It consisted of single-class seating with no catering, interlining baggage, valet parking, or frequent flyer points. After a month back in the air, the Golden Wing Club Lounges reopened, but like the scaled-back flying operation, provided no refreshments or other amenities apart from coffee and water. Ansett was essentially in "lock down" mode, while the administrators tried to source buyers in a very challenging market. Ansett Mark II traded only as "Ansett" in a different font to separate it from the former operation. It traded from Ansett terminals, with Ansett ground staff, crew, and baggage handlers working around the clock to make it a success with limited resources. Designated gates at each of Ansett's terminals were used for the operation, while aircraft not being used were moved away to more distant gates, with the disused concourses being sealed off.

In November 2001, Ansett creditors voted to allow the Tesna consortium, led by Melbourne businessmen Solomon Lew and Lindsay Fox, to purchase Ansett's mainline assets. The plan involved creating a whole "new" Ansett out of the ashes of the old, but the trademark font and "Star Mark" logo reinstated. It would be a full-service, two-class, single fleet-type domestic airline. It included very reduced staff numbers and an all new Airbus A320 fleet. The new Ansett would operate out of the old Ansett terminals, and temporarily lease the former Ansett's A320 fleet until newer replacements arrived. Loyalty products such as the Golden Wing Club and Global Rewards frequent-flyer program would be relaunched.

Those members of Golden Wing Club at the time of the collapse would have their memberships reinstated for a six-month period if they used the new Ansett. A new CEO was sourced and hired, and began to put together a new management team. A new head office was planned, and Airbus showcased a new A320 to the consortium. A new catering company was selected, with new Business and Economy Class in-flight meals trialed on passengers on select Mark II services in readiness for the new operation.

The agreement with Ansett's administrators, although well-advanced, collapsed in late February 2002. Without any prior warning, the administrators announced on 27 February that Fox and Lew had withdrawn their bid, citing "[i]nability to complete the transaction on legal advice". At a press conference the same day, Fox and Lew announced that they had received no financial support from the government for their bid, and were therefore withdrawing.

With no other saviours, and no realistic chance for Ansett to be revived as a viable concern, the administrators had no choice but to cease all flying operations at 23:59 on 4 March 2002, with the last commercial flight, AN152 from Perth to Sydney, operated by A320-211 VH-HYI, touching down at 06:53 on 5 March. Staff filled Golden Wing Lounges across the country for mass wakes as the final flights came in to land.

Entitlements
By this point, the administration of the company had transferred to newly formed insolvency firm KordaMentha. The Australian Securities & Investments Commission began an investigation of whether Ansett had traded while insolvent, and eventually determined in July 2002 that it would be too expensive and difficult to proceed with an action which would, in any case, need to be many separate actions on behalf of individual creditors rather than just one.

With Ansett now grounded again, the administrators began selling off Ansett's assets. This included its regional subsidiary airlines, which still continued to trade despite Ansett being grounded. A creditors meeting post March 2002 voted in favour of an organised wind-up of the operation, under a deed of company arrangement, as opposed to an immediate liquidation. It was viewed that a deed of arrangement would give creditors a greater return than liquidation would provide.

Laid-off Ansett workers were eventually paid most of their entitlements, partly from an A$150 million compensation package offered by Air New Zealand in return for having the ASIC inquiry dropped, but mostly through asset sales and leasing revenue. The Federal Government did provide an A$350 million loan which is being repaid by the Administrators at the same time as the staff are being repaid however, to ensure that there is no exposure to taxpayers, a $10 per seat levy was imposed by the Federal Government on Australian airline passengers. Employees ended up receiving 96% of their entitlements.

Administration and asset sales

Ansett's administrators, KordaMentha, initially advised creditors that it was unlikely that much more money would be realised, due to the depression of the global aviation industry after the September 11 attacks in New York City and Washington, DC had the effect of reducing the value of aircraft from A$300 million to A$70 million. In the months following the final flight, the administrators negotiated the sale of the terminal leases back to the airport owners, recouping millions. Auctions were held to sell Ansett's airport furniture and equipment. Its headquarters at 465/489 and 501 Swanston Street, Melbourne were sold to PDG Corporation. Some aircraft stored in heavy maintenance were broken up, as it was not cost-effective to restore them to an airworthy state.

The disposal of the former fleet did not progress quickly, given the depressed aviation market and the subsequent lack of demand by other carriers around the world whose operations had been crippled by the 9/11 attacks only months before. Following the final flight, nearly all of the A320 fleet was ferried back empty to Melbourne, where they sat at abandoned gates in storage. The Airbus A320 and Boeing 737 fleets ultimately found new owners first, and departed Australia between March 2002 and December 2006 as the banks finally reclaimed them, or as new owners were found.

The two Boeing 747s that were leased from Singapore Airlines were reclaimed within weeks of the collapse and returned to Singapore Airlines, which restored the original colours. They subsequently found new lives and were leased to Fiji's national carrier Fiji Airways, then known as Air Pacific. The more modern Boeing 767-300, of which Ansett had two, were reclaimed by the lessors in the following months, while two new Boeing 767-300 aircraft which arrived too late to enter service with Ansett, departed soon after. One aircraft was wet leased on a short-term basis by Qantas to bring additional aircraft to cover the loss of Ansett, but the aircraft retained its Ansett registration while under lease to it. Another new 767-300, which was halfway through its ferry from Canada, never made it to Australia and returned to Canada. The Kendell CRJ-200 jets returned to Canada within twelve months of the initial collapse.

With the newer aircraft gone, most of the older Boeing 767-200 fleet were moved from the Melbourne terminal gates as Virgin Blue moved into the former Ansett Terminal, and were placed into long-term storage at the Ansett Engineering Base until late 2004, when most were sold off to Aeroturbine and flown to the United States to be broken up into spare parts. Many of the British Aerospace 146 aircraft were also stored but broken up at Melbourne. As of 2008 the remains of one BAe 146 sit derelict at Brisbane Airport, and another BAe 146 remains at Perth Airport, although neither of them are still owned by Ansett or expected to fly again. A lone Boeing 767-200 survived the scrappers cull, was sold and continues to fly in the United States as a charter aircraft.

As of 2006, there were still in excess of 217,000 items and two properties belonging to the airline remaining for sale. In June 2011, it was announced that the Special Employee Entitlements Scheme for Ansett employees had finished making payments to former staff and the administration of Ansett had come to an end. Staff received roughly 96% of their entitlements.

Fleet

The Ansett Australia fleet as of 13 September 2001 (last day of trading) was made up of the following aircraft:

Only the Airbus A320 was utilised from Ansett's original fleet during the brief re-launch of operations as "Ansett Mark II" from October 2001 to March 2002. The Boeing 737, Boeing 767, and Boeing 747 fleets were grounded from September 2001 onwards as were the BAe 146 fleet, with the exception of a one-off revenue flight from Cairns to Brisbane in November 2001, operating off the back end of a charter flight for the government. Two other Ansett BAe 146 aircraft were chartered by the federal government in late 2001 during the federal election campaign.

Several of the defunct fleet types did operate ferry flights back to Melbourne from wherever they ended up across Australia in the months after the collapse, and operated the occasional test flight around Melbourne to retain currency.

Of the subsidiary fleets, only the Kendell Bombardier CRJ200 did not return to active flying. The Fokker 50, Saab 340, Twin Otter and Metro 23 regional aircraft were all back flying for Skywest, Kendell, Hazelton and Aeropelican in the weeks following the collapse. Both Kendell and Hazelton merged to create Regional Express Airlines. As of 2013, five former Kendell Saab 340s are in service with Regional Express with the others phased out. Three of the former Hazelton Airlines Saab 340s are in service with Regional Express.

Historical fleet

At various times Ansett Australia and its predecessors, Ansett Airways and Australian National Airways and partnering carriers operated the Boeing 727, -100, -200 Advanced and the purpose-built 727 LR, Bristol Freighter, Cessna 550, Convair 340, Convair 440, de Havilland Dragon, de Havilland Canada DHC-4 Caribou, de Havilland Canada DHC-6 Twin Otter, de Havilland Canada Dash 7, de Havilland Heron, Douglas DC-3 and C-47 Skytrain, Douglas DC-4, Douglas DC-5, Douglas DC-6, Fokker F-27, Fokker F-28, Fokker Universal, Lockheed Model 10 Electra, Lockheed L-188 Electra, LET L-200A Morava, Douglas DC-9, Mohawk 298, Piaggio P.166 and Vickers Viscount.

Ansett Flying Boat Services operated the Consolidated PBY Catalina, Short Sandringham and Short Sunderland.

At various times the Ansett-ANA helicopter division operated the Bell 47J Ranger, Bell 206, Bristol Sycamore, Sikorsky S-61 and Sikorsky HH-52 Seaguard.

Ansett Worldwide Aviation Services owned the Airbus A300, Airbus A310 and Boeing 757 for leasing.

One of the most unusual aircraft that was operated by Ansett was the Aviation Traders ATL-98 Carvair from the 1960s. Three of the airline's own DC-4s were delivered to the United Kingdom for conversion by Aviation Traders Limited, the company run by Sir Freddie Laker as managing director.

Historically, whichever aircraft carried the registration VH-RMA (the initials of Reginald Miles Ansett) was the unofficial flagship of the airline. The code was carried by a Douglas C-47 Skytrain from 1948 to 1956, a Lockheed L-188 Electra from 1959 to 1984 and a Boeing 767-200 (Ansett Worldwide Aviation Services) from 1992 to 1997. The registration VH-RMA was purchased by Tesna Holdings in January 2002 but never used.

Cabin services 

Ansett Australia offered up to three cabin classes (First, Business and Economy Classes) in varied seat configurations throughout its 66-year run. At the time of its collapse, this had reverted to just two travel classes (Business and Economy), both domestically and internationally:

International fleet: (B747-300/B747-400/B767-300ER)
 International Business Class
 International Economy Class

Domestic Fleet: (B767-200/B767-300ER/B737-300/A320-200/BAe-146-200)
 Domestic Business Class
 Domestic Economy Class

International business class
Ansett International's last business class was introduced with the arrival of the Boeing 747-400. It offered 42 single recliner seats in a 2-2-2 configuration on the main deck, with around 160 degrees of recline. Ansett Australia's retrofitted two Boeing 747-400 series aircraft equipped with these recliner seats mostly served the Australia-Asia (Hong Kong and Osaka) international flights. The recliner seats were equipped with inflight entertainment including personal televisions/touch screens with AVOD, personal telephones in every seat and laptop 110 V AC power outlets.

On Ansett International's 767 fleet, Business seating was in a 1-2-2 configuration, with recliner seats and AVOD similar, but not identical to those on the B747.

Domestic business class
Originally launched as BusinessFirst in 1997, and then reverting to just Business Class in 1999, Ansett Domestic's last business class offered 24 single lounge chair seats grouped in groups of two allowing a more spacious area on its domestic configured 767-300ER and 200ER/200 fleet in a 2-2-2 configuration. Ansett Australia's domestic business class seats were also installed on the Airbus A320-200 series, the Boeing 737-300 series, and the BAe-146 fleet in a 2–2 layout. These aircraft mostly served Australian domestic flights, however select 767-200ER, A320 and 737 services were also used on the Australia-Asia/Fiji (Denpasar, Hong Kong and Nadi) international flights as demand dictated.

International economy class
The new international economy class was introduced with the arrival of the Boeing 747-400. It offered 398 seats equipped with adjustable wings in the headrest and an adjustable footrest to provide extra comfort. Ansett Australia's international economy class seats were also installed on some of the Boeing 767-200s, and some of the Boeing 767-300s. Seat rows were in a 3-4-3 configuration on the Boeing 747-400s lower deck and mostly a 3–3 configuration on the upper deck, a 2-3-2 configuration on the Boeing 767-200 and Boeing 767-300s. The Airbus A320 and Boeing 737s retained their domestic configuration for international service. These aircraft mostly served Australian domestic flights and some of the Australia-Asia/Fiji (Denpasar, Hong Kong, Osaka and Nadi) international flights. The seats were equipped with inflight entertainment including personal televisions and personal telephones in every seat.

Domestic economy class
The new domestic economy class was also introduced with the arrival of the Boeing 767-300ER, offering 224 seats. Ansett Australia's domestic economy class seats were also installed on some of the Airbus A320s, some of the BAe-146 series, some of the Boeing 737-300 series, some of the Boeing 767-200 series and some of the Boeing 767-300 series aircraft. Seat rows were in a 3–3 configuration on the Airbus A320 and the Boeing 737-300s, a 2–3 configuration on the BAe 146 series aircraft and a 2-3-2 configuration on the Boeing 767-200 and Boeing 767-300s. These aircraft mostly served Australian domestic flights and some of the Australia-Asia/Fiji (Denpasar, Hong Kong and Nadi) international flights.

Ansett Mark II cabin
Following Ansett's limited re-launch under administration, it operated only Economy Class with a scaled back no-frills service. The A320s with convertible Business Class seating were configured back to all Economy, while the A320 cabins with fixed Business Class seating retained the Business seat but was considered all one cabin. Bottled water was offered throughout the flight.

Destinations and routes

Oceania
  Australia
Australian Capital Territory
Canberra (Canberra Airport)
New South Wales
Sydney (Sydney Airport)
Northern Territory
Alice Springs (Alice Springs Airport)
Darwin (Darwin International Airport)
Uluru (Ayers Rock Airport)
Queensland
Brisbane (Brisbane Airport)
Cairns (Cairns Airport)
Gold Coast/Coolangatta (Gold Coast Airport)
Hamilton Island (Hamilton Island Airport)
Mackay (Mackay Airport)
Mount Isa (Mount Isa Airport)
Proserpine (Whitsunday Coast Airport)
Sunshine Coast/Maroochydore (Sunshine Coast Airport)
Townsville (Townsville Airport)
South Australia
Adelaide (Adelaide Airport)
Tasmania
Hobart (Hobart International Airport)
Launceston (Launceston Airport)
Victoria
Melbourne (Melbourne Airport)
Western Australia
Argyle (Argyle Airport)
Broome (Broome International Airport)
Kalgoorlie (Kalgoorlie-Boulder Airport)
Karratha/Dampier (Karratha Airport)
Kununurra (Kununurra Airport)
Newman (Newman Airport)
Geraldton (Geraldton Airport)
Paraburdoo (Paraburdoo Airport)
Perth (Perth)
Port Hedland (Port Hedland Airport)
  New Zealand
Auckland (Auckland Airport)
Christchurch (Christchurch Airport)
  Fiji
Nadi (Nadi International Airport)

Asia
  Malaysia
Kuala Lumpur (Sultan Abdul Aziz Shah Airport) 
  Indonesia
Jakarta (Soekarno–Hatta International Airport)  and Kemayoran Airport before 1985
Denpasar (I Gusti Ngurah Rai International Airport)
  People's Republic of China
Shanghai (Shanghai Hongqiao International Airport) 
  Hong Kong (Hong Kong International Airport) and Kai Tak Airport, British Hong Kong before 1998
  Republic of China
Taipei (Taiwan Taoyuan International Airport) (formerly Chiang Kai Shek International Airport) 
  Japan
Osaka (Kansai International Airport)
  South Korea
Seoul (Gimpo International Airport) 

: Terminated prior to Air New Zealand takeover.
: Terminated during the Asian financial crisis.

Star Alliance
On 30 March 1999 Ansett Australia joined the Star Alliance, a global network of carriers, opening up interline agreements with a dozen different carriers connecting to over 100 countries across the world. Reciprocal rights for certain Star Alliance membership tiers was offered, including earning frequent flyer points and a wide selection of lounge access. The Star Alliance logo was added to every aircraft in the Ansett fleet, as well as its regional subsidiary airlines. Other Star member carriers like United Airlines benefited greatly by Ansett's membership, with seamless feeder connections from its trans-Pacific services. Membership in the Star Alliance was suspended upon the Ansett Group entering administration. Upon sale to the Tesna Consortium it was planned for the airline to rejoin Star Alliance, however the 4 March shutdown rendered this meaningless.

Services
Ansett Australia offered travellers a range of services up to the time of 14 September 2001:

Golden Wing Club
Golden Wing Club was the airport lounge service owned and operated by Ansett. Members received a bi-monthly magazine called Travelling Life, as well as many other features. Golden Wing Club Lounges were located throughout Australia in Melbourne, Sydney, Brisbane, Adelaide, Perth, Canberra, Cairns, Darwin, Gold Coast, Alice Springs, and Hamilton Island. Ansett also ran international Golden Wing Clubs at Sydney and Perth, with an added "First Class" section of the Sydney Club for those travelling International First Class from 1994 to 1998. Access was available to Golden Wing Club members travelling on an Ansett or subsidiary service (e.g. Kendell, Aeropelican and Skywest) on the day of travel. Complimentary access was granted for Global Rewards Diamond and Sapphire members, as well as Star Alliance Gold (and above) members.

Lounges were for a time, located in Auckland, Wellington and Christchurch with members being able to access all Star Alliance Lounges as well. The lounges initially closed following the appointment of administrators and subsequent grounding of the group in September 2001, however select lounges re-opened in a scaled-back capacity in Melbourne, Sydney, Brisbane, Adelaide and Perth only from November 2001 until March 2002 while Ansett Mark II was operating.

Following Ansett's final flights in March 2002, the lounges permanently closed. In the weeks that followed they were emptied of their expensive artwork and other items of value in subsequent auctions, leaving behind furniture and a variety of fittings, most of which was purchased by the various airport owners who bought the terminals back from Ansett's administrators. Today, many of the former Golden Wing Clubs in Australia live on as new lounges, occupied by Virgin Australia as its member lounge in Melbourne, Sydney and Brisbane, through leases secured with the airport owners. The former Golden Wing in Cairns was used initially by Australian Airlines as a crew training facility followed by Qantas as a temporary Qantas Club while the Cairns terminal underwent redevelopment, before being demolished in the terminal redevelopment. The Perth Golden Wing was used by charter airline Alliance, and then became Virgin's sixth lounge before being vacated in late 2015 when Virgin relocated to the new Domestic T1 terminal. The Canberra Lounge was used by Virgin Blue and eventually closed and demolished to make way for the new Canberra Terminal redevelopment. The Adelaide and Gold Coast lounges have both, in the process of terminal redevelopments, been demolished.

Ansett Executive Lounge
The Ansett Executive Lounge, also known as "Ansett Pass" and "Ansett Managers Lounge" was an exclusive airport lounge service owned and operated by Ansett. Membership was by invitation only, and offered luxury rivaling that of the world's finest five-star hotels. As membership was quite select, the lounges were significantly smaller than those of Golden Wing Clubs. Executive lounges were located throughout Australia (Melbourne, Sydney, Brisbane, Adelaide, Canberra, and Perth) and New Zealand (Auckland, Wellington, and Christchurch).

These lounges closed at time of administration and did not reopen. In the years since the collapse, many of the former executive lounges were demolished after the airport owners purchased the leasing rights from Ansett's administrators. For a time, regional carrier Regional Express Airlines used the former Canberra lounge as a lounge area for its passengers. Virgin Blue used the former Executive Lounge in Sydney for its initial "Blue Room" and later on "The Lounge" product, but relocated to the former Golden Wing Club lounge in 2008. The former lounges are still in existence in Sydney, Brisbane and Perth, but are now used for other purposes and not accessible to passengers.

Global Rewards
Global Rewards was Ansett Australia's Frequent Flyer Program from 1991 to 2001. It was formerly known simply as "Ansett Frequent Flyer". Points could be used for services from Ansett Australia and their partners including flights, upgrades, holidays, hotel stays and car rentals. Diners Club was a significant financial services partner in Global Rewards. Points held at the time of the airline's collapse lost their value as no other airline took over the program as had taken place with the collapse of some other airlines.

Chauffeur drive
Ansett offered a limousine service, for those wishing to hire for journeys to and from the airport to the CBD in Adelaide, Brisbane, Cairns, Melbourne, Perth and Sydney. It also offered airport-to-suburb service in Melbourne, Perth and Sydney.

Valet parking
Ansett offered a valet parking service in major Australian and New Zealand airports. This also offered the convenience of kerbside check-in, and car cleaning for additional cost.

Capital Shuttle
Ansett's Capital Shuttle operated between Sydney and Canberra. This service mainly used Saab 340 and Bombardier CRJ-200 aircraft, with small use of A320 and 737 aircraft mostly in peak periods. 'Capital Shuttle' services departed from a specially marked gate at Sydney Airport, Gate 14.

Air cargo
Also known as Ansett Air Freight during its time, Ansett ran a significant freight operation which specialised in the transport of items too large for normal carriage, along with heavy-freight contracts with numerous suppliers and contractors.

Terminal transfers
Ansett ran a scheduled terminal transfer service at Sydney Airport, which offered seamless connection from its Domestic terminal to the International terminal for Ansett Australia services connecting to Ansett International. An Ansett bus operated the shuttle service which departed from a transfer lounge located between its two domestic concourses. The shuttle would route across the airside tarmac and runways and arrive near customs at Terminal 1.

Accidents and incidents
On 17 May 1946, VH-UZP Lockheed 10B Electra "Ansalanta", Essendon to Parafield (Ansett Airways inaugural direct service). Controlled flight into terrain on an instrument approach, aircraft ended inverted – 12 on board survived without serious injury.
On 30 November 1961, Ansett-ANA Flight 325, a Vickers Viscount, crashed into Botany Bay shortly after take-off from Kingsford-Smith Airport, Sydney, New South Wales. The starboard wing failed in a thunderstorm. All 15 people on board were killed.
On 22 September 1966, Ansett-ANA Flight 149, a Vickers Viscount, crashed at Winton, Queensland after a mid-air fire caused structural failure of the port wing. All 24 people on board were killed.
On 19 October 1994, Ansett Australia Flight 881, a Boeing 747-300 (VH-INH) operating Sydney to Osaka, returned and landed at Sydney without the nose wheel extended. Approximately one hour after departure the crew shut down the number one engine because of an oil leak. They returned the aircraft to Sydney where the approach proceeded normally until the landing gear was selected. With selection of the landing gear and selection of the flap beyond a setting of flaps 20, the landing gear warning horn began to sound because the nose landing gear had not extended. The flight crew unsuccessfully attempted to establish the reason for the warning. Believing the gear to be down, the crew elected to complete the landing, with the result that the aircraft was landed with the nose gear retracted. There was no fire and the pilot in command decided not to initiate an emergency evacuation. All passengers and crew were evacuated safely
On 19 May 2000, Boeing 767-200 VH-RMO suffered a nose wheel collapse at Sydney Terminal during an overnight service. The aircraft was not occupied by passengers or crew at the time

Sponsorship

Sport
Ansett Australia was one of the major sponsors of the Australian Football League, holding the naming rights to the AFL pre-season competition, the Ansett Australia Cup. It was also a major sponsor of Waverley Park. The logo was visible around the stadium.

Ansett was also a Major Sponsor of Australian Cricket, with the Ansett Australia Test Series a prominent fixture of the Australian summer. Ansett's logo (called the StarMark) appeared on all players' training and game shirts, as well as around the boundary and on the field during Test Series.

The airline was the official airline of the Sydney 2000 Olympic Games. Boeing 767-300 ER VH-BZF carried the Olympic Flame from Athens to Guam for the start of the torch relay through Oceania. An A320-211 carried the Olympic Torch from Auckland to Uluru, to commence the Olympic Torch relay in Australia.

Since Qantas's Take over of Australian Airlines in 1992, Ansett acquired the rights to selective sponsorship of various teams involved in the Australian Touring Car Championship and Seven Networks commentary team between various airports close to racing venues around Australia from 1994 to Ten Network's takeover of V8 Supercar Series AVESCO (V8 Supercars Australia) launched the new series in 1997, but the insignia remained on various cars until Ansett folded in 2001.

It was also the sleeve / major sponsor of the Brisbane Broncos National Rugby League team from 1996 until 2001.

Film and television
Ansett Australia sponsored the soap opera Neighbours in the late 1980s, having previously received publicity when its aircraft were used in the filming of another production by Reg Grundy — 1977's ABBA: The Movie. Ansett often sponsored Channel 9's Nightline late night news program from 1994 to 1997.

Ansett also offered on-board News and movies, entitled (Ansett Sky Show). It consisted of a twice daily 30-minute news service (AM and PM), which was recorded by Channel 7 studios in Sydney entitled Seven Ansett News, which was then transmitted by satellite to all Ansett capital city, and some regional airport locations. The news service was then dubbed to video cassettes, and was then distributed onto Ansett aircraft first thing in the morning and exchanged halfway during the operational day for the second afternoon/evening broadcast. For the domestic fleet, movies and television shows were recorded to tape and distributed to each aircraft once a month.

On international aircraft, the news was available in one edition (usually morning). Movies and television shows were recorded onto a central data system on both 747-400 and one 767-300ER aircraft, which was changed monthly.

Ansett's safety demonstration was done via TV screens throughout the aircraft as well as in person, at the time of its demise.

Related companies

Ansett Worldwide Aviation Services (AWAS)

Ansett Worldwide Aviation Services or simply Ansett Worldwide was one of the world's largest commercial jet aircraft leasing companies. It was Ansett Australia's subsidiary and leasing arm from 1985 until February 2000. AWAS was acquired by Dubai Aerospace Enterprise in 2017.

Ansett Flight Simulator Centre / Ansett Aviation Training
The Ansett Australia Flight Simulator Centre located in Melbourne had continued trading under administration, following the company's insolvency as it was one of the few Ansett businesses that could operate profitably, independent of the airline. An agreement was reached by the Deed Administrators in October 2004 for its sale to Aviation Training Australasia Pty Ltd. The sale included the business, related buildings, land and the Ansett owned Flight Simulators. Nineteen former Ansett Australia employees jobs were saved in the sale, and Aviation Training Australasia elected to operate the centre under the trading name of Ansett Flight Simulator Centre and later Ansett Aviation Training, dropping the "Australia" off the end of Ansett, but retaining the well recognised Ansett Star Mark logo, reflective of Ansett's last livery.

In April 2008, it announced that it was undergoing a major expansion and will be getting simulators for the current-generation Boeing 737, Fokker 100, Beechcraft King Air and Embraer EMB-120 Brasília, as well as a second Airbus A320 simulator due an extension to centre's existing building.

From 2008 Ansett Aviation Training continued growing to become the biggest Australian Training provider in the Asia Pacific Region, adding D level full flight simulators:

 Airbus A320 I, II & III 
 Airbus A320 CEET 
 BAe 146 
 Boeing 737 Classic 
 Dash 8 100/200/300 
 Embraer 120 
 Fokker 100 
 King Air 200 
 Metro III/23 
 Saab 340

First in its Melbourne hub, later opening new training centers in Milan, at Malpensa Airport (Italy) in 2017 with 4 new simulators:

 Airbus A320
 BAE 146 – Avro rj (DUBLIN)
 Boeing 737-800W
 BOMBARDIER CL-415

Earlier in 2018 in Taipei (Taiwan):

 A320
 ATR-600

And in the second half of 2018 inaugurating in Brisbane (Queensland) its 3 bay simulation new building on the vicinity of the Brisbane International Airport by the Minister for State Development, Manufacturing, Infrastructure and Planning Hon Cameron Dick MP, to accommodate a brand new ATR72-600 TRU simulator, adding in early 2019 a second Fokker 100 full flight simulator, acquiring full certification from CASA (Civil Aviation Safety Australia) to operate both of them :

 ATR-600
 Fokker 100
 King Air 350i/200 (Maroochydore)

John Holland Aviation Services
With the demise of Ansett airline operations in 2002, the engineering services business, formerly known as the Ansett Australia Maintenance Base located at Melbourne Airport, was retained under the name of Ansett Aviation Engineering Services (AAES), primarily to care for the Ansett aircraft held in storage having mandatory ongoing maintenance, and also for other airlines supplying third party maintenance. Through five years of administration, AAES continued to operate despite Ansett Australia no longer trading.

New business was secured and the engineering skills base continued to grow. The AAES business was acquired by the John Holland Group in June 2007 under the banner of John Holland Aviation Services. As part of the sale to John Holland Group, 155 AAES staff and management had the opportunity for ongoing employment.

Ansett Aircraft Spares and Services
Ansett Aircraft Spares and Services is a company that serves the aviation community by selling aircraft spares as well as maintenance work for airplanes such as Airbus, Boeing, Bombardier, British Aerospace, Douglas aircraft and Fokker types, with offices in Sylmar, California, Hayes, Hillingdon, the United Kingdom, Melbourne, Australia and Istanbul, Turkey. Ansett Aircraft Spares and Services also has a logistics division.

List of Ansett Subsidiary Airlines 
Kendell Airlines, became a subsidiary in 1990
Hazelton Airlines, became subsidiary in 1999

 Kendell & Hazelton merged and became Regional Express Airlines after collapse of Ansett Australia.

Aeropelican Air Services, became subsidiary in 1980
Skywest Airlines, became subsidiary in 1983
East-West Airlines, became subsidiary in 1993

List of associated businesses
Ansett New Zealand, a defunct airline, originally a subsidiary of Ansett Australia
East-West Airlines, former subsidiary of Ansett Australia ceased October 1993
Ansett Aviation Engineering Services
Ansett Aircraft Finance Limited
Ansett Australia and Air New Zealand Engineering Services Limited
Ansett Aviation Equipment Pty Ltd
Ansett Equipment Finance Limited
Ansett Flying Boat Services
Ansett Pioneer, interstate coach operator
Ansett Worldwide Aviation Services, an aircraft leasing organisation which used to be a subsidiary of Ansett Australia
Diners Club Australia, credit card provider. 68.2% share owned, was sold back to Diners Club USA in 1999.
National Instrument Company (later renamed Ansett Technologies), originally part of ANA, an aircraft instrument and avionics servicing business. Also involved in defence electronics systems integration.
Austarama Television Pty Ltd, which commenced television broadcasting in Melbourne in 1964 as ATV-0 (later  ATV-10).
Universal Telecasters Queensland (TVQ-0 Brisbane), later (TVQ-10),  49.9% was purchased in 1964, with full control gained in 1970.
Ansair, originally a manufacturer of aircraft seats, the business diversified into bus and coach manufacturing.
Ansett Wridgways (now Santa Fe Relocation)
Ansett International Travel
Transport Industries Insurance

Ansett Aviation
Ansett Aviation is a Helicopter training flight school, with operations in Western Australia, Tasmania and Queensland. While run by a member of the Ansett family, it is not connected to the defunct national airline. It is run by the grandson of Sir Reginald Ansett, Will Richards. Originally called Marine Helicopter Charters, Richards later changed the name to continue the family legacy. It is the only Ansett Air related business run still run by a member of the Ansett family. It uses the old logo of the airline, from the 1970s. The company was started by Richards in 2003.

While similarly named, the company is not connected to  Ansett Aviation Training. It has the intellectual property rights to use the original Ansett Logo, through the family. This operation only flies helicopters, including pilot training  The company has taken over some traditional flights originally operated by flying boats on the Queensland coast.

Legacy
The Ansett Transport Museum is housed in the company's first aircraft hangar at Hamilton.

In popular culture

 Australian band Client Liaison reference Ansett in several of their retro themed music videos.
 Australian artist Lee Kernaghan references Ansett Australia in the 2012 song Flying With The King.

See also

Air Niugini
Ansett New Zealand
Kendell Airlines
List of companies of Australia
Transport in Australia
 List of defunct airlines of Australia
 Aviation in Australia
Bob Ansett

References

Notes

Bibliography

KordaMentha, "Ansett Group (Subject to Deeds of Company Arrangement) Sixth Report to Creditors 31 March 2006" (PDF)

Documentaries
Air Australia: War in Suits  
The Ansett Story .

External links

Administration
Official Ansett Australia Administration Website

Company
Company website (Archive)

History
Sir Reginald Ansett Transport Museum
Key Australian Aviation Policy Developments: The Ansett Airlines Context 1937–18 July 2003 Chronology, Economics, Commerce and Industrial Relations Group, Parliamentary Library, Parliament of Australia
Ansett Airlines Ephemera, National Library of Australia
AIRLINES & AIRCRAFT OF THE ANSETT GROUP 1921–2002

Businesses
Ansett Aircraft Spares & Services 
Ansett Aviation Engineering Services

Employee information and support groups
The Spirits of Ansett
AnsettStars

Official Ansett merchandise
Ansett Merchandise

 
Australian companies established in 1935
Air New Zealand
Airlines disestablished in 2002
Airlines established in 1935
Defunct airlines of New Zealand
Defunct airlines of Australia
Former News Corporation subsidiaries
Former Star Alliance members
Defunct seaplane operators
Australian companies disestablished in 2002